The Tripartite Consultation (International Labour Standards) Convention, 1976, officially the Convention concerning tripartite consultations to promote the implementation of international labour standards is an International Labour Organization Convention, which governs the process for implementation of measures regarding ILO conferences. It requires tripartite consultation before ratification, implementing legislation or denouncement of conventions. As of November 2021, the convention had been ratified by 156 member states.  The convention is also known as convention number 144 on the List of International Labour Organization Conventions.

References

External links
Treaty text
Ratifications

International Labour Organization conventions
Labor relations
1976 in labor relations
Treaties concluded in 1976
Treaties entered into force in 1978
Public policy
Treaties of Albania
Treaties of Algeria
Treaties of Antigua and Barbuda
Treaties of Argentina
Treaties of Armenia
Treaties of Australia
Treaties of Austria
Treaties of Azerbaijan
Treaties of the Bahamas
Treaties of Bangladesh
Treaties of Barbados
Treaties of Belarus
Treaties of Belgium
Treaties of Belize
Treaties of Benin
Treaties of Bosnia and Herzegovina
Treaties of Botswana
Treaties of Brazil
Treaties of Bulgaria
Treaties of Burkina Faso
Treaties of Burundi
Treaties of Canada
Treaties of the Central African Republic
Treaties of Chad
Treaties of Chile
Treaties of the People's Republic of China
Treaties of Colombia
Treaties of the Comoros
Treaties of the Democratic Republic of the Congo
Treaties of Costa Rica
Treaties of Ivory Coast
Treaties of Cyprus
Treaties of the Czech Republic
Treaties of Czechoslovakia
Treaties of Denmark
Treaties of Djibouti
Treaties of Dominica
Treaties of the Dominican Republic
Treaties of Ecuador
Treaties of Egypt
Treaties of El Salvador
Treaties of Estonia
Treaties of Ethiopia
Treaties of Fiji
Treaties of Finland
Treaties of France
Treaties of Gabon
Treaties of West Germany
Treaties of Ghana
Treaties of Greece
Treaties of Grenada
Treaties of Guatemala
Treaties of Guinea
Treaties of Guyana
Treaties of Honduras
Treaties of Hungary
Treaties of Iceland
Treaties of India
Treaties of Indonesia
Treaties of Ba'athist Iraq
Treaties of Ireland
Treaties of Israel
Treaties of Italy
Treaties of Jamaica
Treaties of Japan
Treaties of Jordan
Treaties of Kazakhstan
Treaties of Kenya
Treaties of South Korea
Treaties of Kuwait
Treaties of Kyrgyzstan
Treaties of Laos
Treaties of Latvia
Treaties of Lesotho
Treaties of Liberia
Treaties of Lithuania
Treaties of Madagascar
Treaties of Malawi
Treaties of Malaysia
Treaties of Mali
Treaties of Mauritius
Treaties of Mexico
Treaties of Moldova
Treaties of Mongolia
Treaties of Montenegro
Treaties of Morocco
Treaties of Mozambique
Treaties of Namibia
Treaties of Nepal
Treaties of the Netherlands
Treaties of New Zealand
Treaties of Nicaragua
Treaties of Nigeria
Treaties of Norway
Treaties of Pakistan
Treaties of Panama
Treaties of Peru
Treaties of the Philippines
Treaties of Poland
Treaties of Portugal
Treaties of the Republic of Afghanistan
Treaties of the Republic of the Congo
Treaties of North Macedonia
Treaties of Romania
Treaties of Russia
Treaties of Saint Kitts and Nevis
Treaties of Saint Vincent and the Grenadines
Treaties of San Marino
Treaties of São Tomé and Príncipe
Treaties of Senegal
Treaties of Serbia and Montenegro
Treaties of Seychelles
Treaties of Sierra Leone
Treaties of Singapore
Treaties of Slovakia
Treaties of Slovenia
Treaties of South Africa
Treaties of Spain
Treaties of Sri Lanka
Treaties of Suriname
Treaties of Eswatini
Treaties of Sweden
Treaties of Switzerland
Treaties of Syria
Treaties of Tajikistan
Treaties of Tanzania
Treaties of Togo
Treaties of Trinidad and Tobago
Treaties of Tunisia
Treaties of Turkey
Treaties of Uganda
Treaties of Ukraine
Treaties of the United Kingdom
Treaties of the United States
Treaties of Uruguay
Treaties of Venezuela
Treaties of Vietnam
Treaties of Yemen
Treaties of Yugoslavia
Treaties of Zambia
Treaties of Zimbabwe
Treaties extended to American Samoa
Treaties extended to Anguilla
Treaties extended to Aruba
Treaties extended to British Hong Kong
Treaties extended to the Falkland Islands
Treaties extended to Gibraltar
Treaties extended to Guam
Treaties extended to Guernsey
Treaties extended to Montserrat
Treaties extended to the Northern Mariana Islands
Treaties extended to Puerto Rico
Treaties extended to Sint Maarten
Treaties extended to the United States Virgin Islands